Jeremy Morrison may refer to:

Jeremy Morrison (MMA fighter), opponent of Alex Stiebling
Jeremy Morrison, character in Friends in Low Places (novel)

See also
Jerry Morrison (disambiguation)